Emilio Petacci (1886–1965) was an Italian film actor.

Selected filmography

 Love Everlasting (1913)
 The Wedding March (1934)
 The Joker King (1935)
 Sette giorni all'altro mondo (1936)
 Joe the Red (1936)
 The Two Sergeants (1936)
 Tonight at Eleven (1938)
 In the Country Fell a Star (1939)
 It Always Ends That Way (1939)
 Heartbeat (1939)
 Saint John, the Beheaded (1940)
 Antonio Meucci (1940)
 The First Woman Who Passes (1940)
 The Cavalier from Kruja (1940)
 Big Shoes (1940)
 The Prisoner of Santa Cruz (1941)
 The Happy Ghost (1941)
 Beatrice Cenci (1941)
 Blood Wedding (1941)
 The Man on the Street (1941)
 Light in the Darkness (1941)
 The Hero of Venice (1941)
 Honeymoon (1941)
 The Countess of Castiglione (1942)
 Souls in Turmoil (1942)
 The White Angel (1943)
 Anything for a Song (1943)
 Special Correspondents (1943)
 Resurrection (1944)
 L'abito nero da sposa (1945)
 Red Moon (1951)
 La figlia del diavolo (1952)
 Cardinal Lambertini (1954)
 The Miller's Beautiful Wife (1955)
 Beatrice Cenci (1956)

References

Bibliography
 Goble, Alan. The Complete Index to Literary Sources in Film. Walter de Gruyter, 1999.

External links

1886 births
1965 deaths
Italian male film actors
Male actors from Rome